Tabatha Coffey (born 17 May 1969) is a United States-based Australian hairstylist, salon owner, and television personality. Her participation as a contestant on the television show Shear Genius in 2007 led to her own fame in the U.S. She was given a television show, Tabatha Takes Over (2008-13), which aired on the US cable television network Bravo. A similar series, Relative Success with Tabatha, aired on Bravo in 2018.

Career 
Coffey, whose mother and brother were hairstylists, got her start in her hometown of Surfers Paradise, Queensland, where she started as an assistant in a local shop at the age of 14. She has stated that her parents operated a strip club in Adelaide, which inspired her interest in hair styling. At 15, she entered a four-year apprenticeship programme to learn more. Later, she moved to London to continue her training for the next three years.

Coffey opened her own salon, Industrie Hair Gurus, in Ridgewood, New Jersey. She also styles clients at the Warren-Tricomi salon in West Hollywood. Her approach is transformative, creating a special look for each individual, unlike other stylists who specialize in a certain look. She also works as a platform artist for hair care product company, Joico International. She tours different countries 6–12 times a year doing hair shows for the company. "My favourite thing is to do work with other professionals and teaching," she said in an interview. "I love giving and getting back from other professionals."

In line with her stated intent to work and teach with other professionals, Coffey sold her Ridgewood, New Jersey, salon in 2011.

She has also been in beauty publications, as well as backstage in New York's Mercedes Benz Fashion Week. She works regularly as an editorial stylist for top fashion and beauty publications, including Seventeen, Marie Claire, and Mademoiselle. She wrote It's Not Really About the Hair: The Honest Truth About Life, Love, and the Business of Beauty, published in 2011, and Own It, published in 2014.

Television 
Coffey was first introduced to American audiences when she became a contestant in the Bravo reality show Shear Genius. Having auditioned out of curiosity, she quickly earned a reputation for her outspokenness and intensity. She was a front-runner in the competition, winning most of the challenges during her stay, but she was eliminated in the sixth episode, along with her teammate for the day, Tyson. She has made no secret of her objections to Tyson's methods, thinking his ego got in the way of his work. The judges eliminated them for their poor teamwork. Coffey later won $10,000 as the show's Fan Favorite.

In 2008, Coffey was approached by Bravo to star in the reality series Tabatha's Salon Takeover in which she uses her hairdressing and business expertise to assist salons that are in danger of closing. The show was renamed Tabatha Takes Over for its fourth season where she used the same formulas to invigorate other types of businesses such as bars and restaurants. She has also appeared on Make Me a Supermodel Season 2, The Tyra Banks Show as a part of Banks's "Glam Squad," and The Biggest Loser along with Tim Gunn, giving makeovers to the show's contestants.

In 2011, Coffey was the host for the NAHA awards.

In 2018, Coffey's new show, Relative Success with Tabatha, aired on Bravo. Coffey uses her business expertise to help struggling families come together not only to help the business but the family as well.

Personal life 
Openly gay, Coffey was in a relationship with her partner, Heather Schuster, since 1995. On June 11th, 2022, Coffey confirmed on Instagram in a since deleted post that Schuster had passed away the evening prior.

References

External links 
 

1967 births
Australian expatriates in the United States
Australian hairdressers
Australian television personalities
Women television personalities
Lesbian entertainers
Lesbian businesswomen
Australian LGBT businesspeople
Australian LGBT broadcasters
Living people
Participants in American reality television series
People from the Gold Coast, Queensland
People from Ridgewood, New Jersey